Thopeutis respersalis is a moth in the family Crambidae. It was described by Jacob Hübner in 1818, and is found in both Uruguay and Chile.

References

Haimbachiini
Moths described in 1818